The ninth season of Frasier was a 24-episode season that ran from September 2001 to May 2002, beginning on September 25, 2001. The opening title screen color was changed to a gradient of orange to white.

Cast

Main
 Kelsey Grammer as Frasier Crane
 Jane Leeves as Daphne Moon
 David Hyde Pierce as Niles Crane
 Peri Gilpin as Roz Doyle
 John Mahoney as Martin Crane

Special appearance by
Tushka Bergen as Miranda
Lisa Darr as Laura
Lindsay Frost as Samantha
Cynthia Lamontagne as Annie
Gigi Rice as Regan
Claire Stansfield as Kristina
Shannon Tweed as Dr. Honey Snow
Lisa Waltz as Tricia
Claire Yarlett as Vicky
Mary Hart as herself
Bill Gates as himself

Special guest

Recurring
Patrick Kerr as Noel
Tom McGowan as Kenny
Brian Klugman as Kirby
Millicent Martin as Mrs. Moon

Guest
Dina Waters as Nanette
Robert Picardo as Charlie
Conrad Janis as Albert
Dan Bucatinsky as Jewelry Clerk
Bellamy Young as Lisa
Trevor Einhorn as Frederick
Jeff Perry as John Clayton
Paul Willson as Paul
Raye Birk as Twitchell
Joe Flaherty as Herm
Bill Hayes as Sully
Suzanne Cryer as Denise
Ted King as Craig
Jay Karnes as Corporate Guy

Episodes

Notes

References 

2001 American television seasons
2002 American television seasons
Frasier 09